Jane Elizabeth Ellison (born 15 August 1964) is a British Conservative Party politician, who was first elected at the 2010 general election as the Member of Parliament for Battersea. On 7 May 2015, she was re-elected with an increased margin of 3.4%. She lost the seat to Marsha de Cordova of the Labour Party at the 2017 snap general election. From 2020 to 2022, she served as Executive Director for External Relations and Governance at the World Health Organization.

Early life and career
Ellison was born in Bradford, attending St. Joseph's Catholic College, Bradford, then a girls' grammar school.  She studied Philosophy, Politics and Economics at St Hilda's College, Oxford. After university, she worked at the John Lewis Partnership, where she held many positions up until her election to the House of Commons some 23 years later.

A former Barnet London Borough Councillor, she contested the 1996 Barnsley East by-election and the 2000 Tottenham by-election, in both cases finishing in third place, and contested Barnsley East and Mexborough in 1997 and Pendle in the 2005 general election. Labour retained the seat, although she almost halved the majority of sitting MP Gordon Prentice from 4,275 to 2,180.

She was selected as the prospective parliamentary candidate for Battersea in September 2006, following an open primary held at the Battersea Arts Centre.

Parliamentary career
Ellison was elected at the 2010 general election, with a majority of 5,977. In Parliament, she served on the Backbench Business Committee and Work and Pensions Committee.

Ellison was appointed Parliamentary Under-Secretary of State for Public Health in October 2013. She described providing political direction to the National Health Service (NHS) as "a bit like being on a high wire without a net at times, it can be quite exciting" in a meeting with the Tory Reform Group in 2014.

According to The Observer, she also said: "I don't know how much any of you realise that with the Lansley act we pretty much gave away control of the NHS… we have some important strategic mechanisms but we don't really have day-to-day control", which was seized upon by critics as evidence that the government's NHS reforms had not succeeded.

In January 2015, Ellison announced the government was proposing introducing a ban on advertising on cigarette packaging before the next election, to some surprise amongst colleagues in the Conservative Party.

In the 2017 general election, Ellison lost her seat to Marsha De Cordova, who increased the Labour share of the vote by 9.1%.

After politics
In October 2017 Ellison was appointed as Deputy Director-General for Corporate Operations at the World Health Organization under the leadership of Director General Tedros Adhanom Ghebreyesus. On 1 January 2020 she became the Executive Director for External Relations and Governance at WHO. She was replaced in 2022.

Other activities
 World Health Summit (WHS), Member of the Steering Committee

Personal life
Ellison lives in Balham with her partner John, and enjoys music and walking.

References

External links

Jane Ellison MP official constituency website
Jane Ellison MP Conservative Party profile
Wandsworth Conservatives

1964 births
21st-century British women politicians
Alumni of St Hilda's College, Oxford
Conservative Party (UK) MPs for English constituencies
Female members of the Parliament of the United Kingdom for English constituencies
Living people
Politicians from Bradford
UK MPs 2010–2015
UK MPs 2015–2017
21st-century English women
21st-century English people